Qotbabad (also Romanized as Qoţbābād; also known as Qoţābād) is a village in Rud Ab-e Gharbi Rural District, Rud Ab District, Narmashir County, Kerman Province, Iran. At the 2006 census, its population was 2,030, in 475 families.

References 

Populated places in Narmashir County